Ross is a lunar impact crater that is located in the northwest part of the Mare Tranquillitatis. It was named after James Clark Ross (British explorer) and Frank E. Ross (American astronomer and optician). It lies south-southwest of the crater Plinius, and northeast of the lava-flooded Maclear.

This crater has a generally circular shape, but is not quite symmetrical. The inner walls slope down to a base of slumped material, before joining a relatively level interior floor. There is a low ridge to the west of the crater midpoint.

Satellite craters
By convention these features are identified on lunar maps by placing the letter on the side of the crater midpoint that is closest to Ross.

References

External links
Ross at The Moon Wiki

 LTO-60B4 Ross — L&PI topographic map

Impact craters on the Moon